Leanna Brodie is a Canadian actress and playwright.

Published writings
 (play)
 (play)
 (play)
The Book of Esther Brodie, Leanna Talonbooks 2012

Unpublished writings
Invisible City. Broadcast by CBC Radio. 2001.
One Woman, One Child. 2002.

Awards
2001, one of NOW Magazine's Top Ten Toronto Theatre Artists.

Performances
2020, Red Phone, Boca del Lupo Theatre, live interactive project 
2010, The Vic, Vancouver B.C Premiere, Produced by Terminal Theatre and Directed by Sarah Szloboda
2000, The Vic, Cahoots Theatre Projects and Theatre Passe Muraille Toronto

References

External links
Leanna Brodie webpage
Talonbooks Author Bio: Leanna Brodie

Canadian Theatre Encyclopedia

Interviews
Now: Brodie Measures Up
eye: Victim positions

Canadian women dramatists and playwrights
Living people
Canadian stage actresses
21st-century Canadian dramatists and playwrights
21st-century Canadian women writers
Year of birth missing (living people)